The 1927 Buffalo Bisons season was their eighth in the league. The team failed to improve on their previous output of 4–4–2, losing five games and winning none. They finished twelfth (last) in the league.

The "Buffalo/Texas Rangers" experiment from the previous season was discontinued (the city's cold weather was the primary reason), and previous head coach Jim Kendrick left the team for the New York Giants. Reverting to the Bisons name, a man with the name Dim Batterson was named as head coach. 

The team failed to score a single point in all but one game, resulting in a 1.6 point per game average, a near-record low offensive output. The Bisons suspended operations five games into the season and would not return until 1929.

Schedule

Standings

References

Buffalo Bisons (NFL) seasons
Buffalo Bisons
Buffalo
National Football League winless seasons